Iona Morris is an American actress. She has performed in numerous films and television shows, including extensive voice work in animation.

Early life
Iona was born in Columbus, Ohio, and is the daughter of late actor Greg Morris (1933–1996) and older sister of Phil Morris.

Career
Morris was the original voice of Storm in the X-Men and Spider-Man: The Animated Series. Her voice work also includes Medusa in the 1994 Fantastic Four series, Claudia Grant in Robotech, Nia/Betty in Phantom 2040, Luba on W.I.T.C.H. and Principal Stringent on Chalkzone.

When she was a child, she appeared (with her brother and future recurring Trek guest actor, Phil) in an episode of the original Star Trek entitled "Miri". Later, Iona appeared in the two part episode of Star Trek: Voyager, "Workforce" and was one of few to star in one of the episodes of the second Twilight Zone series. She has also made numerous guest appearances on many television shows, including The Wayans Bros. In 2006, she was the voice of Jean Grant in Robotech: The Shadow Chronicles.

She also appeared as Colonel Louise James in the cinematic version of Command and Conquer 4.

Filmography

Film

Television

Video games

References

External links
 
 

Living people
American voice actresses
African-American actresses
Actresses from Columbus, Ohio
American television actresses
20th-century American actresses
21st-century American actresses
Year of birth missing (living people)
20th-century African-American women
20th-century African-American people
21st-century African-American women
21st-century African-American people